Kirill Pavlov may refer to:
 Kirill Aleksandrovich Pavlov (born 1990), Russian footballer
 Kirill Pavlov (weightlifter) (born 1986), Kazakhstani weightlifter
 Cyril Pavlov (1919–2017), Russian Orthodox Christian mystic, elder, wonder-worker and Archimandrite